John Voight may refer to:

Jon Voight (born 1938), American actor
John Voight (athlete) (1926–1993), American sprinter
Wolfgang Zilzer (1901–1991), German-American actor who used the stage name "John Voight"
John Voight (mathematician), University of Vermont mathematician and winner of the 2010 Selfridge Prize